Rifargia is a genus of moths of the family Notodontidae erected by Francis Walker in 1862.

Species
Rifargia bichorda (Hampson, 1901)
Rifargia distinguenda (Walker, 1856)
Rifargia lineata (Druce, 1887)
Rifargia xylinoides Walker, 1862
Rifargia occulta Schaus, 1905

References

Notodontidae